Cobden Bridge is a major road bridge in Southampton, UK. It crosses the River Itchen joining the suburbs of St Denys and Bitterne Park. It forms part of the A3035. The present bridge dates from 1928, but there has been a bridge on this site since 1883.

The first bridge (1883)
The National Liberal Land Company purchased the land that is now Bitterne Park in 1882, and began developing it for residential purposes. An iron bridge was constructed across the Itchen to St Denys, thus improving access and vastly increasing the value of the land.

The bridge was opened with the promise to be "free to the public for ever". This was in clear competition to Northam Bridge further south, which at that time was a toll bridge.

The bridge was named Cobden Bridge after Richard Cobden, a prominent Liberal politician. Cobden was notable as a campaigner for free trade, and formed the Anti-Corn Law League. The bridge was opened on 27 June 1883 by Thorold Rogers, another Liberal politician and friend of Cobden, who was also chairman of the Land Company.

The bridge was the site of several clashes between local gangs soon after opening.

The second bridge (1928)

A new five arch concrete bridge, vastly superior to its predecessor, was built between 1926 and 1928, to better cope with the increases in size and volume of traffic.

The new bridge was opened on 25 October 1928 by Wilfred Ashley, then Minister of Transport.

References

Buildings and structures in Southampton
Bridges in Hampshire
Transport in Southampton